The hybrid elm cultivar Ulmus × hollandica 'Dauvessei', one of a number of cultivars arising from the crossing of the Wych Elm U. glabra with a variety of Field Elm U. minor, is a very rare cultivar said to have originated at the D. Dauvesse nursery in Orléans, France before 1877.

Description
According to Henry's description (1913) based on a tree at Kew, the branches ascend to form a broad, pyramidal crown; the leaves bear a resemblance to Wych Elm, but are generally smaller, rarely exceeding 10 cm long by 5 cm wide, and thinner in texture, with petioles nearly 1 cm long. Krüssmann added that the leaf-base was more oblique. 

The US National Arboretum, however, described the 'Dauvessei' that once grew in West Potomac Park, Washington, D.C., as similar in appearance to English Elm (in its lower latitude growth-form), forking at about 2 metres, reaching about 20 m tall by 18 m broad. Herbarium specimens from the Washington trees show less elongated, rounder leaves than those at Kew, with fewer vein-pairs (see 'External Links').

Pests and diseases
The tree is susceptible to Dutch elm disease.

Cultivation
There are no confirmed surviving specimens of 'Dauvessei'. In the United States specimens stood along The Mall in Washington D.C. among American Elms on either side of the Reflecting Pool (2009), but it is not known whether any survive. A 2018 Cornell University study of the National Mall elms found five possible Ulmus × hollandica there (cultivar unidentified). A tree acquired from the Nobelius nursery in 1929 and grown at the University of Adelaide Waite Arboretum, Australia, died in 1997; Melville confirmed the 'Dauvessei' identification, reconfirmed by the arboretum in 1992.

Putative specimen
In the UK a broad pyramidal tree matching 'Dauvessei' descriptions and 'Dauvessei' herbarium material from a specimen in West Potomac Park, Washington, D.C., producing hybrid-type samarae, stands in the east corner of Claremont Park, Leith, by Seafield Place. Its location and tidy shape suggest a named cultivar.

Hybrid cultivars
'Dauvessei' was crossed with Ulmus × hollandica, U. glabra, and U. minor in the Dutch elm breeding programme before World War II, but none of the progeny were of particular note and were discarded.

Synonymy
Ulmus campestris var. Dauvessi Hort.: Lavallée , Arboretum Segrezianum 235, 1877.
Ulmus montana var. Dauvessei: Nicholson, Kew Hand-List Trees and Shrubs, 2: 139, 1896.

References

External links

Kew specimen
 Labelled Ulmus dauvessei; Kew Gardens specimen (1936) 
 Labelled Ulmus × hollandica nm. dauvessei (Henry; 'type tree'); Kew Gardens specimen (1955)

Washington specimens
 West Potomac Park specimen 1, Washington, D.C. (1966) 
"Herbarium specimen HUDC00010315" Howard University Herbarium; West Potomac Park, specimen 2, Washington, D.C. (1966)
"Herbarium specimen HUDC00010316 Howard University Herbarium; West Potomac Park, specimen 3, Washington, D.C. (1966)
 West Potomac Park samara specimen, Washington, D.C. (1966)  

Dutch elm cultivar
Ulmus
Ulmus articles missing images